Amini is a Muslim surname of Arabic origin, meaning a descendant of someone named Amin. It may refer to:

 Ali Amini (1905–1992), Prime Minister of Iran (1961–1962)
 Ebrahim Amini (born 1925), Iranian Ayatollah and politician in the Assembly of Experts
 Mahsa Amini (1999–2022), Iranian woman whose death triggered international protests
 Mustafa Amini (born 1993), Australian association football player
 Max Amini, an Iranian-American comedian